A leadership election was held by the People's Justice Party (KeADILan) on 10 November 2001. It was won by incumbent President of KeADILan, Wan Azizah Wan Ismail.

Central Executive Committee election results
Source

Permanent Chairman

Deputy Permanent Chairman

President

Deputy President

Vice Presidents

Central Executive Committee Members

References

2001 elections in Malaysia
Political party leadership elections in Malaysia
November 2001 events in Asia
National Justice Party leadership election